Adrian Lewis Morgan (born 15 February 1973) is a Welsh actor, known for portraying the role of Jimmi Clay in the BBC soap opera Doctors. Having appeared since 2005, he is the longest serving cast member on Doctors.

Early life
Morgan was born in Beddau on 15 February 1972, and has one sister. Morgan attended Llantwit Fardre School, Bryn Celynnog Comprehensive School, and the Royal Welsh College of Music & Drama. At the age of 17, Morgan worked in a hotel serving breakfasts, but left the job after two weeks. In 1998, Morgan was involved in a car accident.

Career
Morgan's first role was as Tobias Ragg in Sweeney Todd at the Royal National Theatre. During his theatre career, he starred in various West End productions, including: Marius in Les Misérables; Roger in Rent; and Judas/Annas in Jesus Christ Superstar. From 2001 to 2002, he appeared in the BBC medical drama Holby City as Liam Evans. Since 2005, he has portrayed the role of Jimmi Clay in the BBC daytime soap Doctors. He is the longest serving cast member on Doctors.

Filmography

Awards and nominations

References

External links
 

Living people
People from Rhondda Cynon Taf
Alumni of the Royal Welsh College of Music & Drama
Welsh male musical theatre actors
Welsh male soap opera actors
1973 births